Jedermann (English: Everyman) is a 1961 Austrian drama film directed by Gottfried Reinhardt, based on the 1911 play of the same title written by Hugo von Hofmannsthal. The film was submitted as the Austrian entry for the Best Foreign Language Film at the 34th Academy Awards, but it was not selected as one of the five nominees in the category.

Plot
Death is sent by God to summon the wealthy bon vivant Jedermann. In his time of greatest need, he is abandoned by his lover, friends and wealth.

Cast
 Walther Reyer as Jedermann
 Ellen Schwiers as Buhlschaft
 Paula Wessely as Glaube
 Sonja Sutter as Gute Werke
 Kurt Heintel as Der Tod
 Paul Dahlke as Mammon
 Ewald Balser as Die Stimme des Herrn
 Heinrich Schweiger as Der Teufel
 Alma Seidler as Jedermanns Mutter
 Max Lorentz as Der Spielansager
 Wolfgang Gasser as Jedermanns guter Gesell
 Viktor Braun as Der Koch
 Helmut Janatsch as Ein armer Nachbar
 Karl Blühm as Schuldknecht
 Roswitha Posselt as Schuldknechts Weib
 Herbert Fux as Knecht

See also
 List of submissions to the 34th Academy Awards for Best Foreign Language Film
 List of Austrian submissions for the Academy Award for Best Foreign Language Film

References

External links
 

1961 films
1961 drama films
1960s German-language films
Austrian drama films
Films directed by Gottfried Reinhardt
Austrian films based on plays
Films set in the Middle Ages
Films about death
Filmed stage productions
Films about personifications of death
Everyman